Bignonia sciuripabula is a flowering plant species in the family Bignoniaceae.

References

sciuripabula